The RBS 56B BILL 2 Anti-Tank Guided Weapon is a man-portable or vehicle-mounted guided anti-tank missile using the overfly top attack method to attack the weaker parts of an armoured vehicle. BILL is acronym for Bofors Infantry Light & Lethal.

System

Design
The RBS 56B BILL 2 was designed upon the original BILL 1 Anti-tank guided weapon that has been in the service of the Swedish Army since 1988. The BILL 2 is currently produced by Saab Bofors Dynamics, who are located in Karlskoga, Sweden. The BILL 2 comes with one 10.5 kg missile, a launching tube, tripod with x7 magnification day sight, and one thermal imaging sight.

Operation
The RBS 56B BILL 2 uses OTA or Overfly Top Attack to attack its target. The missile flies towards the target on a standard horizontal trajectory, but rather than directly hitting the target head on, it overflies it, detonating its warhead on top of an armored vehicle, where the armour is usually lighter. It also utilizes additional guidance accuracy via the installed rate gyro, which monitors the tracking movement of the launcher. It is designed primarily to attack armoured or unarmoured vehicles, but can also be used to attack helicopters or soft ground targets, such as light buildings.

The BILL 2 can be mounted onto a variety of vehicles and then fired remotely from inside the vehicle.

Firing Modes
The BILL 2 has three firing modes that the launcher's operator can select, before launching the missile.

 Basic – In this mode the missile will use both of its sensors to hit the armoured vehicle from the top.
 Non-Armored – In this mode the missile uses no sensors and flies on a LOS or line-of-sight, while using the impact fuse.
 Soft Target – In this mode the optical sensor is used, but the magnetic sensor is not. The missile then uses OTA to attack its target.

Missile
The BILL 2 Missile uses a SACLOS or semi-automatic command to line-of-sight guidance system, and is controlled via a communications wire that trails behind the missile from the launch tube. The BILL 2 warhead has an optical and magnetic sensor. The optical sensor serves to find the target's range, while the magnetic sensor detects metallic targets to determine the best point for the missile to detonate. The BILL 2 contains both a proximity fuse and an inertial impact fuse. The BILL 2 is armed with a pair of vertically striking explosively formed penetrator warheads, which each direct a self-forging slug of metal downwards at extreme velocities using a high explosive blast. The 40 mm frontal "precursor" warhead destroys any reactive armour protecting the target and leaves the 110 mm rear warhead to penetrate the armour.  Total penetration capabilities are classified, but are known to be at least 550 mm in rolled homogeneous armor.

Operators
: Known as Panzerabwehrlenkwaffe PAL 2000 Bill

: In service from 1999 to 2013, returned to service in December 2021

References

External links
Army Technology: BILL 2

Anti-tank guided missiles of Sweden